The Devon Longwool was a British breed of domestic sheep from south-west England. It was distributed in southern Somerset and northern Devon, and was – like the Greyface Dartmoor and the South Devon – a polled longwool sheep. It is now considered extinct, as in 1977 it was merged with the South Devon to form the Devon and Cornwall Longwool.

History 

A breed society, the Devon Longwool Sheep Breed Society, was formed in 1898. A flock book was begun in 1900.

References 

Sheep breeds
Sheep breeds originating in England
Devon
Extinct sheep breeds